Lyudmila Ivanovna Gurevitch (nee Shevtsova later Lysenko; born 26 November 1934) is a retired Soviet athlete who competed mainly in the 800 metres. On 3 July 1960, she set a world record in this event at 2 min 4.3 seconds. She equalled this time while winning the 800 m gold at the 1960 Olympics two months later. Two Australians, Brenda Jones and Dixie Willis led the race. With 50–70 m left, Willis stepped on the curb and dropped out of competition, while Shevtsova gradually reached Jones and won in the last meters.

In 1954 Shevtsova finished second in the 800 m at the national and third at European Championships. At the 1962 European Championships she failed to reach the final. During her career she won nine national titles: in the 400 m in 1955; in the 800 m in 1955–56, 1959, and 1961–62; and in the cross-country in 1960–62 and 1964. After retiring from competitions she coached athletics in Kiev, Ukraine. She was awarded the Order of the Red Banner of Labour in 1960.

Shevtsova first trained in artistic gymnastics, and changed to running only in 1951, after winning by surprise a cross country race at the Dnipropetrovsk championships. She married twice and thus changed her last name to Lysenko and then to Gurevich. She has two sons from different marriages, Oleg (born 1957), and Vladimir. She lives in Kiev with her second husband, an athletics coach.

References

1934 births
Living people
Olympic athletes of the Soviet Union
Athletes (track and field) at the 1960 Summer Olympics
Soviet female middle-distance runners
Russian female middle-distance runners
Olympic gold medalists for the Soviet Union
People from Temryuksky District
Avanhard (sports society) sportspeople
Medalists at the 1960 Summer Olympics
European Athletics Championships medalists
Olympic gold medalists in athletics (track and field)
Ukrainian female cross country runners
Sportspeople from Krasnodar Krai